Tardos may refer to:
 Tardos, Tata, a village in Hungary
 Anne Tardos (born 1943), French artist
 Éva Tardos (born 1957), Hungarian mathematician
 Tardos function, in graph theory
 Gábor Tardos (born 1964), Hungarian mathematician

See also 
 Tadros